Juan Muñoz (17 June 195328 August 2001) was a Spanish sculptor, working primarily in paper maché, resin and bronze. He was also interested in the auditory arts and created compositions for the radio. He was a self-described "storyteller". In 2000, Muñoz was awarded Spain's major Premio Nacional de Bellas Artes in recognition of his work; he died shortly after, in 2001.

Personal life
Juan Muñoz was born in 1953 into a prosperous, educated family in Madrid. He was the second of seven brothers. He enrolled in a local school but became bored and was expelled, so his father retained a poet who was also an art critic to provide lessons, which gave  Muñoz an awareness of modernism. He grew up under Franco's repressive regime. In the 1970s, he moved to England to study at Croydon College and the Central School of Art and Design. There he met his wife, sculptor Cristina Iglesias, with whom he has two children, Diego (b. 1995) and Lucia (b. 1989). His marriage to Cristina also made him the brother-in-law of the Academy Award-nominated film composer, Alberto Iglesias.  In 1982 he was awarded a Fulbright scholarship and traveled to the United States to study at the Pratt Institute in New York City. He spoke an idiosyncratic English, learned from his experience as a waiter in New York restaurants.

Career
His first exhibition was in 1984 in the Fernando Vijande gallery of Madrid. Since then, his works have been frequently exhibited in Europe and other parts of the world. At the beginning of the 1990s, Juan Muñoz began breaking the rules of traditional sculpture by sculpting works in a "narrative" manner which consisted of creating smaller than life-size figures in an atmosphere of mutual interaction. Muñoz's sculptures often invite the spectator to relate to them, making the viewer feel as if they have discreetly become a part of the work of art. His slate-gray or wax-colored monochrome figures create a sort of discreetness due to their lack of individuality, but that absence of individuality questions the viewer, perhaps even so much as to make the viewer uncomfortable. When asked his occupation, Muñoz would respond simply that he was a "storyteller."

His first solo show in the UK was at the Arnolfini, Bristol curated by Stephen Snoddy. Muñoz's sculptures were created primarily with paper maché, resin and bronze. In addition to sculpture, Muñoz was interested in the creation of auditory arts, creating some works for the radio. One of his more recognized auditory works was a collaboration with British composer Gavin Bryars in 1992 called A Man in a Room, Gambling, which consisted of Muñoz explaining card tricks over a composition by Bryars. The pieces, ten segments all shorter than five minutes, were played on BBC Radio 3.

In one unpublished radio program (Third Ear, 1992), Juan Muñoz proposed that there are two things which are impossible to represent: the present and death, and that the only way to arrive at them was by their absence.

In 2000, Muñoz was awarded Spain's major Premio Nacional de Bellas Artes, about which Muñoz said, "I think I'll buy a watch."

Juan Muñoz died suddenly of cardiac arrest caused by an aneurism of the esophagus and an internal hemorrhage at the age of 48 in his summer home in Santa Eulària des Riu, Ibiza, in 2001.

He has been called "the most significant of the first generation of artists to achieve maturity in post-Franco Spain, and one of the most complex and individual artists working today." His works are displayed in such galleries as the Guggenheim Museum Bilbao, Guggenheim Museum in New York,  Hirshhorn Museum and Sculpture Garden in Washington D.C., the Art Institute of Chicago, and the Tate Modern in London.

See also
Last Conversation Piece

References

Bibliography
 Berger J. & Wagstaff S., Juan Muñoz: A Retrospective, Tate Publishing, 2008

External links
  http://www.juanmunozestate.com Juan Muñoz Estate This is the official website of the artist
 Paul Schimmel, Juan Muñoz Interview, Chicago University Press, 18 September 2000
 Adrian Searle, Juan Muñoz (obituary), The Guardian, 30 August 2001
 James Hall, The bronze sorcerer, The Guardian, 12 January 2008
 Adrian Searle, Shadows and silence, Spanish artist Juan Muñoz, The Guardian, 22 January 2008
 Juan Muñoz, a Retrospective, Tate Modern (exhibition), 24 January – 27 April 2008
 James Lingwood on Juan Muñoz January 2008
 Juan Muñoz's works for radio at Ràdio Web MACBA
 PAF:Conversation Piece NYC

1953 births
2001 deaths
20th-century Spanish sculptors
Spanish sculptors
Spanish male sculptors
Alumni of Croydon College
Alumni of the Central School of Art and Design
Spanish contemporary artists